The United Basketball Conference (UBC) was a scheduling alliance of NCAA Division I basketball independents which began play in January 2007. Its members were:
 Indiana University – Purdue University Fort Wayne (IPFW)
 New Jersey Institute of Technology (NJIT)
 North Dakota State University (NDSU)
 South Dakota State University (SDSU)
 University of Texas–Pan American (UTPA)
 Utah Valley University

NDSU, SDSU and IPFW joined The Summit League on July 1, 2007. NJIT, UTPA and Utah Valley joined the Great West Conference on July 10, 2008. 

Utah Valley was the men's "champion" for the 2006–07 season, with a 9–1 conference record and a 22–7 record overall.

NCAA Division I basketball
2006–07 NCAA Division I men's basketball season